Rauschenberger is a German locational surname, which originally meant a person from the town of Rauschenberg, Hesse in Germany. The name may refer to:

Ariel Rauschenberger (born 1966), Argentine politician
Ryan Rauschenberger (born 1982), American politician
Steve Rauschenberger (born 1956), American politician
William C. Rauschenberger (1855–1918), American politician

See also
Rauschenberg (surname)

References

German-language surnames